Bruegel is a think tank devoted to policy research on economic issues. Based in Brussels, it launched its operations in 2005 and currently conducts research in five different focus areas with the aim of improving economic debate and policy-making.

Bruegel was recognised as the best international economics think tank worldwide and the second best think tank in the world, according to the 2020 Global Go To Think Tank Report.

It has a governance and funding model based on memberships from Member States of the European Union, international corporations, and other institutions.

History
Bruegel's name is a tribute to Pieter Bruegel, the 16th-century painter whose work epitomises unvarnished and innovative depictions of life in Europe. It also stands for the "Brussels European and Global Economic Laboratory", even though Bruegel does not consider its name to be an acronym. The think tank was initially co-founded by the economists Jean Pisani-Ferry and Nicolas Véron in 2002. It was officially endorsed by former French President Jacques Chirac and German Chancellor Gerhard Schröder at the 40th anniversary of the Elysée Treaty in January 2003.

Former European Commissioner Mario Monti was instrumental in Bruegel's creation and became its first Chairman in early 2005, following the think tank's legal creation as an International Non-Profit Association under Belgian law and its first Board election in 2004.

The Board was successively chaired by Mario Monti (2005–08), Leszek Balcerowicz (2008–12), Jean Claude Trichet (2012-2020) and Erkki Liikanen (2020–present). Jean Pisani-Ferry was Bruegel's Director from January 2005 to April 2013 before being succeeded in his role by Guntram Wolff. Jeromin Zettelmeyer became the new Director of Bruegel in September 2022.

Bruegel moved to its current premises, on Rue de la Charité/Liefdadigheidsstraat 33 in central Brussels, in April 2005.

Research programme
Bruegel's research is divided into seven broad research areas: Banking and capital markets, Digital economy and innovation, European governance, Global economy and trade, Green economy, Inclusive economy, and Macroeconomic policies.  The research programme is reviewed every three years while the research priorities are developed on a yearly basis in the autumn by the Board after discussions with Bruegel scholars, members and other stakeholders.

Publications and events 
Bruegel's scholars regularly publish their research through post on the think tank's blog. For more in-depth analysis of their research topics, they also release policy briefs, policy contributions, working papers and blueprints. They have presented testimonies at the European Parliament and various national parliaments.

Bruegel also hosts events which gather experts, the public and various stakeholders for in-depth discussion on a range of policy issues. The events are often livestreamed with the video and audio recordings on Bruegel's website. In 2021, they hosted 93 events throughout the year and released 50 episodes of their podcast series "The Sound of Economics". This is in addition to over 150 blog posts and 45 publications.

Governance and funding
Bruegel is a non-profit international association under Belgian law (AISBL), governed by its Statutes and its Bylaws. Bruegel’s highest decision making forum is the General Assembly consisting of Bruegel’s members. It confirms the Board and elects six of its members directly.

The Board decides on strategy, adopts the research programme and budget and appoints the Director and the Deputy Director each for a period of three years renewable twice. Bruegel's board is elected for a three-year term by its members and consists of 11 individuals with backgrounds in government, business, academia and civil society. As of September 2020, its members were Erkki Liikanen (Chairman), Agnès Bénassy Quéré, Karolina Ekholm, Jose Manuel Gonzalez-Paramo, Rachel Lomax, Isabelle Mateos Y Lago, Simone Mori, Elena Pisonero, Jörg Kukies, Monika Marcinkowska and Alessandro Rivera. The board decides on Bruegel's research agenda, a process that is conducted on a yearly basis and includes in-depth consultation of all members. It also appoints the director and deputy director, and oversees Bruegel's financial management and budget. However, under Bruegel's statute and bylaws, neither the Board nor the members can interfere in research results and publication decisions‚ the responsibility for which remains with the director and individual scholars.

Bruegel’s former chairs Leszek Balcerowicz and Jean Claude Trichet are honorary chairmen of Bruegel. Mario Monti is the founding chairman of Bruegel.

The Director – currently Jeromin Zettelmeyer – is responsible for the executive management of Bruegel, with the assistance of the Deputy Director, currently Maria Demertzis and the rest of the management team, which includes Stephane Asse'e, Giuseppe Porcaro and Scarlett Varga. They prepare the Board meetings, the research programme, annual work plan, budget, and annual report and present them to the Board. The Director and Deputy are responsible for the editorial direction, exercise editorial oversight of publications and control the quality of output. Bruegel takes no institutional standpoint and publications reflect the views of the authors only. Bruegel’s Scientific Council advises on research and provides regular academic appraisals of published papers.

Bruegel is supported by a wide array of members which contribute the bulk of its financial resources. The majority of its resources comes from state and corporate members.

As of September 2022, Bruegel's membership consisted of three categories. State members are Member States of the European Union, which join on a voluntary basis, including Austria, Belgium, Cyprus, Denmark, Finland, France, Germany, Hungary, Ireland, Italy, Luxembourg, Malta, the Netherlands, Poland, Slovakia, Spain and Sweden. The United Kingdom also holds membership. Corporate members are international corporations and firms, many of which are headquartered in the European Union. Institutional members include national and international public financial institutions as well as central banks.

Awards and recognition

In 2012, the University of Pennsylvania ranked Bruegel 8th out of 600 different think tanks in a report called "The Global Go To Think Tanks Rankings and associated trends report"

Transparify has repeatedly awarded Bruegel five stars out of five for transparency, including in 2018. Prospect Magazine Awarded Bruegel the European Economic Think Tank of the Year in 2015, 2016, 2017 and 2019.

The 2020 Global Go To Think Tank Index Report, published by the University of Pennsylvania, ranked Bruegel as such:

 #1 Top Think Tanks in Western Europe 

 #1 Top International Economics Policy Think Tanks 

 #2 Top Think Tanks Worldwide (US and Non-US)  

 #2 Think Tanks with Outstanding Policy-Oriented Research Programs  

 #2 Best Quality Assurance and Integrity Policies and Procedures 

 #2 Best Institutional Collaboration Involving Two or More Think Tanks 

 #4 Think Tanks with the Most Significant Impact on Public Policy 

 #5 Best Managed Think Tanks 

 #5 Think Tanks with the Best Use of the Internet 

 #5 Best Use of Media (Print or Electronic)

Organisation 

Bruegel research team is composed of senior fellows, non-resident fellows, research fellows and affiliate fellows as well as a team or research assistants.

The non-research staff is responsible for Bruegel's daily operations, development outreach, event coordination and communications.

The management team ensures the coordination of both research and non-research staff, and it is composed by Jeromin Zettelmeyer (Director), Maria Demertzis (Deputy Director), Stéphane Asse'e (Head of Operations and Finance), Scarlett Varga (Head of Development) and Giuseppe Porcaro (Head of Outreach, Governance and Human Resources).

Evaluation 
Bruegel regularly asks an ad hoc task force to review the impact and relevance of its work. The most recent analysis was conducted in 2022 and was co-chaired by Peter Praet and Elsa Fornero. This and previous reports have been posted online by Bruegel. The scientific assessment component of such reviews is provided by Bruegel's scientific council composed of eight individuals and chaired by Arnoud Boot.

References

European integration think tanks
2005 establishments in Belgium
Think tanks established in 2005
Political and economic think tanks based in Europe
Political and economic think tanks based in the European Union
Think tanks based in Belgium
Pieter Bruegel the Elder